Agrostis perennans, the upland bentgrass, upland bent, or autumn bent, is a species of flowering plant in the grass family, Poaceae.

Description
This perennial bunchgrass grows in clumps without rhizomes or stolons, with erect stems growing to about 8-31 inches (20–80 cm). The species name perennans means "perennial".

Distribution
Agrostis perennans, upland bentgrass, is native to North and South America; it grows in fields, fens, open woods, thickets, and along roadsides.

References

perennans
Bunchgrasses of North America
Bunchgrasses of South America
Grasses of North America
Flora of North America
Grasses of South America
Flora of South America
Flora of Georgia (U.S. state)